The S1.5400 (GRAU Index 11D33) was a Soviet single-nozzle liquid-propellant rocket engine burning liquid oxygen and kerosene in an oxidizer-rich staged combustion cycle, being the first rocket engine to use this cycle in the world. It was designed by V. M. Melnikov, an alumnus of Isaev, within Korolev's Bureau, for the Molniya fourth stage, the Block-L. It was also the first Soviet engine designed for start and restart in vacuum and had the highest Isp at the time of its deployment.

Its development took from 1958 to 1960. The first production run was started in May 1960, and it passed all the firing tests. Its first flight failed before the Block-L was activated. The first success was in a Venera flight during 1961. Between 1961 and 1964 it went through an improvement program that ended up in the S1.5400A1 version (GRAU Index 11D33M).

The turbopump initial spin-up is pyrotechnic. The engine is attached to a Cardan suspension, which enables it to gimbal up to 3° in two axes.

See also
Molniya - The original rocket to use the S1.5400.
OKB-1 - RSC Energiya is the successor of the S1.5400 designer bureau, OKB-1.

References

External links
 RSC Energia Corporation Home Page

Rocket engines of Russia
Rocket engines of the Soviet Union
Rocket engines using kerosene propellant
Rocket engines using the staged combustion cycle
Energia rocket engines